Park Town is the legislative assembly, that includes the city, Chennai. Park Town assembly constituency was part of Chennai Central parliamentary constituency till 2008.

Members of the Legislative Assembly

Election Results

2006

2001

1996

1991

1989

1984

1980

1977

1971

1967

References

External links
 

Former assembly constituencies of Tamil Nadu
Chennai district